Water polo at the 2008 Summer Olympics was held from 10 August to 24 August 2008 at the Ying Tung Natatorium in Beijing, People's Republic of China.

Medalists

Men's medalists

Women's medalists

Qualification

Men

Women

References

Sources
 PDF documents in the LA84 Foundation Digital Library:
 Official Results Book – 2008 Olympic Games – Water Polo (download, archive)
 Water polo on the Olympedia website
 Water polo at the 2008 Summer Olympics (men's tournament, women's tournament)
 Water polo on the Sports Reference website
 Water polo at the 2008 Summer Games (men's tournament, women's tournament) (archived)

External links
FINA Water Polo
Beijing 2008 Olympics
Water Polo – Official Results Book

 
O
2008 Summer Olympics events
2008
2008